Henri Gerard Marie Weenink  (17 October 1892, Amsterdam – 2 December 1931) was a Dutch chess player and a problem composer.

He took 2nd, behind Fick, at Amsterdam 1918/19; tied for 4-5th at Amsterdam 1919 (Richard Réti and Max Marchand won), tied for 3-6th at Rotterdam 1919 (Réti won); shared 2nd, behind Abraham Speijer, at Amsterdam 1919; took 6th at Amsterdam 1920 (Réti won), tied for 2nd-3rd at Amsterdam 1921 (Quadrangular), shared 13th at Scheveningen 1923 (System 10+10, Paul Johner and Rudolf Spielmann won), tied for 3rd-4th at Amsterdam 1925 (Quadrangular), tied for 2nd-3rd with Salo Landau, behind Max Euwe, at Amsterdam 1929 (NED-ch), tied for 8-9th at Liege 1930 (Savielly Tartakower won), and won, ahead of Euwe and Spielmann, at Amsterdam 1930.

Weenink played four times for Netherlands in Chess Olympiads:
 In the 1st Chess Olympiad at London 1927 (+5 –7 =3); 
 In the 2nd Chess Olympiad at The Hague 1928 (+3 –6 =7); 
 In the 3rd Chess Olympiad at Hamburg 1930 (+7 –3 =6); 
 In the 4th Chess Olympiad at Prague 1931 (+2 –9 =6).

Weenink died of tuberculosis at the age of 39.

References

External links
Henri Weenink at 365Chess.com

1892 births
1931 deaths
20th-century deaths from tuberculosis
Dutch chess players
Sportspeople from Amsterdam
Chess Olympiad competitors
Chess composers
20th-century chess players
Tuberculosis deaths in the Netherlands